American Thinker is a daily online magazine dealing with American politics from a politically conservative viewpoint. It was founded in 2003 by attorney Ed Lasky, health-care consultant Richard Baehr, and sociologist Thomas Lifson, and initially became prominent in the lead-up to the 2008 U.S. presidential election for its attacks on then-candidate Barack Obama. The magazine has been described as a conservative blog. The Southern Poverty Law Center has called the site "a not so thoughtful far-right online publication.".

In the aftermath of Donald Trump's loss in the 2020 U.S. presidential election, the American Thinker published a variety of articles that had claims of election fraud. Faced with a lawsuit from Dominion Voting Systems, Lifson acknowledged that the site had relied upon "discredited sources who have peddled debunked theories". The American Thinker likewise admitted that its election claims were "completely false and have no basis in fact" and that "it was wrong for us to publish these false statements."

Contributors 

One of the American Thinkers most prolific contributors, Raymond Ibrahim, has written over 100 articles extremely critical of Islam.  Another, David Solway, in the months following the 2020 presidential election, contributed seven articles perpetuating the myth of a stolen election based on evidence such as "Biden's rallies routinely featured twenty or so vehicles in a car park. That alone tells us that Biden was never in the game."

Coverage 
In 2009, in the wake of the election of Barack Obama, the American Thinker joined a wave of conservative media publications discussing the possibility of a second Civil War. They forecast the possibility of "several regional republics" emerging following the "overbearing, oppressive leviathan" of Obama's presidency.

A 2008 column in the American Thinker drew attention to a California plan to require programmable thermostats that could be controlled by officials in the event of power-supply difficulties. According to The New York Times, the column was "by turns populist..., free-market..., and civil libertarian".

Right Wing Watch has written about American Thinker, including that the site had in 2014 published a complimentary piece on white nationalist Jared Taylor and in 2015 asserted that rainbow-colored Doritos are a "gateway snack to introduce children to the joys of homosexuality". In a 2020 blog post on the site, Thomas Lifson referenced a paper published in Geophysical Research Letters to claim that sea level rise has been slow and constant, and that this rise pre-dated industrialization. This claim went viral over social media in March 2020. The author of the paper describes this interpretation as factually incorrect, constituting climate misinformation.

Under threat of litigation, in January 2021 American Thinker published a retraction of unsupported stories it published asserting that Dominion Voting Systems engaged in a conspiracy to rig the 2020 presidential election against President Donald Trump, acknowledging, "These statements are completely false and have no basis in fact."

References

External links
 

Online magazines published in the United States
Conservative magazines published in the United States
Magazines established in 2005
Magazines published in the San Francisco Bay Area